Healaugh (pronounced "hee-law") is a small village in the  civil parish of Reeth, Fremington and Healaugh, in Swaledale in the Yorkshire Dales. It is in the Richmondshire district of North Yorkshire, England and lies about 1 mile west of Reeth.

The name Healaugh is derived from a Saxon word (Heah) meaning a high-level forest clearing.

The village is small, with no amenities except a stone trough fed by a hillside stream, and the village telephone box. The latter is unusually well endowed, with a carpet, waste paper bin, ash tray, directories and fresh flowers. Visitors may leave a donation.

On 5 July 2014, the Tour de France Stage 1 from Leeds to Harrogate passed through the village.

See also
Reeth, Fremington and Healaugh

References

External links

Villages in North Yorkshire
Civil parishes in North Yorkshire
Swaledale